The LoToJa Classic is a long distance one-day amateur bicycle road race from Logan, UT to Jackson Hole, WY, USA. It is held in September on the first Saturday after Labor Day.

About LoToJa 
LoToJa was started in 1983 by two Logan cyclists, David Bern, a student at Utah State University, and Jeff Keller, the owner of Sunrise Cyclery. The two men wanted a race that resembled the difficulty of a one-day European classic like Paris-Roubaix or the Tour of Flanders. LoToJa's first year featured seven cyclists racing 192 miles from Logan to a finish line in Jackson's town square. The winning time was just over nine hours by Bob VanSlyke.

Many compete to win their respective category, while others just ride to cross the finish line. At 200+ miles, LoToJa is the longest one-day USAC-sanctioned bicycle race in the country. Cyclists must conquer three mountain passes as they pedal through the scenic terrain of Utah, Idaho and Wyoming en route to a finish line below the rugged Tetons at the base of Jackson Hole Mountain Resort.

Course 
The race starts at the bike shop in Logan, Utah and heads north into southeastern Idaho and winds across western Wyoming. The finish line is near the base of the Grand Teton at Jackson Hole Mountain Resort (at Teton Village), one of America's ski destinations.

Notable Winners 
 Levi Leipheimer (Team RadioShack) 
 Marty Jemison (U.S. Postal)
 Scott Moninger
 John Frey
 Alison Tetrick

Charitable Fundraising 
LoToJa is a major fund-raiser for the Huntsman Cancer Foundation, Autism Spectrum Disorder Connections and other medical research foundations. As of 2014, LoToJa organizer Epic Events has raised over US$250,000 for the Huntsman Cancer Foundation

Course Records 

The current course record was set by Spencer Johnson, of Riverton Utah, with a time of 8:18:29 (2018). The women’s course record, 9:35:00, set in 2013, is held by Melinda MacFarlane.

History

2006 - Epic Duel 
In 2006, racers Zach "Sick Pony" Hope and Jason Sawyer had an epic duel to the finish.  Jason Sawyer blew a tire right near the end.

2007 – 25th Anniversary 
The 2007 race included roughly 1,400 people from 40 different states in the United States. The fastest time in the 2007 edition of the race was posted by Mark Zimbelman, a resident of Provo, Utah, who won the masters 45+ category.  His time of 9:06:44 was also good for a course record with Mark Schaefer finishing less than a wheel length behind. Schaefer and Zimbelman led the race alone for the last . The winner of the Men's Pro Category 1 and 2 race was Cameron Hoffman of Clearfield, Utah with a time of 9:24:18.

2009 – new course record 
Zimbelman's course record held during 2008 but was beaten in the 2009 race by Cameron Hoffman of Clearfield, Utah with a time of 9:02:52. This was Hoffman's third year in a row winning the Men's Pro Category 1,2,3 race. Hoffman, David Francis of Las Vegas, Nevada, and Robert Lofgran of Salt Lake City, Utah had to chase  racer Dave Botchek (Colorado Springs CO) who had been out in front 190 miles before being caught due to a puncture 13 miles from the finish. Dave Botchek had previously won the event in the 90's. They finished 1st, 2nd and 3rd, respectively with less than a second between Hoffman and Francis and Lofgran finishing about five seconds later.

2010 – Another new course record 
Cameron Hoffman's 2009 course record time of 9:02:52 was broken in 2010 by Alfred Thresher with a time of 9:01:44.

2012 – Disaster Strikes 
Rob Verhaaren crashed and died during the final stages of the race in Wyoming. 

A new LOTOJA course record was set by Leon Bergant from Slovenia, with the time of 8:57:19.

References

External links
LOTOJA Website
Sunrise Cyclery's LoToJa History
Deseret News coverage of the 2007 race
Video of 2007 finish line sprint
2007 Milliseconds Sports LOTOJA Results
Herald Journal article on the 2007 race
BYU Newsnet article on the 2007 race

Cycle races in the United States
Recurring sporting events established in 1983
1983 establishments in Utah
1983 establishments in Wyoming
Road bicycle races
Sports competitions in Utah
Sports competitions in Wyoming